RMIF is a four letter abbreviation that can refer to:

The Retail Motor Industry Federation
The RMIF (Rigas muzikas instrumentu fabrika)

fr:RMI
it:RMI